Osman Nuri Koptagel (1874; Erzincan – November 22, 1942; Ankara) was an officer of the Ottoman Army and a general of the Turkish Army.

When he was an assistant teaching staff of the Ottoman Military Academy, he used to order "Sağdan birinci manga, kop ta gel!" ("First squad from the right, separate (from line) and come!"), "Birinci mangadan sağdan itibaren beş kişi kop da gel!" ("First squad of five person from the right, separate (from line) and come!"). His students gave him a nickname "Kop ta gel". After the 1934 Surname Law, Mustafa Kemal gave him a surname "Koptagel".

His granddaughter Yüksel Koptagel (born 27 October 1931) is a Turkish composer and pianist.

Medals and decorations
Order of the Medjidie 4th class
Silver Medal of Liyaqat
Silver Medal of Imtiyaz
Prussia Iron Cross
Medal of Independence with Red Ribbon

See also
List of high-ranking commanders of the Turkish War of Independence

Sources

External links

1874 births
1942 deaths
People from Erzincan
Republican People's Party (Turkey) politicians
Deputies of Malatya
Ottoman Army officers
Turkish Army generals
Ottoman military personnel of the Balkan Wars
Ottoman military personnel of World War I
Turkish military personnel of the Turkish–Armenian War
Turkish military personnel of the Greco-Turkish War (1919–1922)
Ottoman Military Academy alumni
Recipients of the Order of the Medjidie, 4th class
Recipients of the Liakat Medal
Recipients of the Imtiyaz Medal
Recipients of the Iron Cross (1914)
Recipients of the Medal of Independence with Red Ribbon (Turkey)
Burials at Turkish State Cemetery